Chereksky District (Çerek rayon) is an administrative and a municipal district (raion), one of the ten in the Kabardino-Balkar Republic, Russia. It is located in the central and southern parts of the republic. Its administrative center is the rural locality (a settlement) of Kashkhatau. As of the 2010 Census, the total population of the district was 26,956, with the population of Kashkhatau accounting for 19.6% of that number.

History
The district was called Sovetsky until May 5, 1994.

Administrative and municipal status
Within the framework of administrative divisions, Chereksky District is one of the ten in the Kabardino-Balkar Republic and has administrative jurisdiction over all of its ten rural localities. As a municipal division, the district is incorporated as Chereksky Municipal District. Its rural localities are incorporated into nine rural settlements within the municipal district, with the exception of the settlement of Kashkhatau, which is incorporated as Kashkhatau Urban Settlement. The settlement of Kashkhatau serves as the administrative center of both the administrative and municipal district.

References

Notes

Sources

Districts of Kabardino-Balkaria
